The 1st Belgrade Special Combat detachment was a special police unit which was established by the German Gestapo in the Territory of the Military Commander in Serbia during World War II.

History

Background
On 6 April 1941, Axis forces invaded the Kingdom of Yugoslavia. Poorly equipped and poorly trained, the Royal Yugoslav Army was quickly defeated. The country was then dismembered, with Serbia being reduced to its pre-1912 borders and placed under a government of German military occupation. With their forces in the Balkans depleted by the need to send troops to the Eastern Front, the Germans sought to find local leaders to police the region for them. In Serbia this came in the form of Milan Nedić, a pre-war politician who was known to have pro-Axis leanings.

Formation
The Germans then utilized a series of irregular armed formations to help stabilize the region. One of these formations was the 1st Belgrade Special Combat detachment, formed in mid-1942 by the German Gestapo without the knowledge of Nedić or his government. It was the intention of SS-Oberführer Emanuel Schäfer, the newly appointed chief of the German Security Police in Serbia, to create "an indigenous Serbian entity through which the Gestapo could exert more control over the Nedić regime. Captain Strahinja Janjić, a reported German agent and member of the Serbian fascist movement Zbor, was selected by Schäfer to lead the new organization. Janjić proceeded to recruit members of quisling formations such as the Serbian State Guard and the Serbian Volunteer Corps, as well as high school students, merchants and officials from Nedić's administration. Members of the detachment then began calling themselves the Serbian Gestapo. Meanwhile, Janjić began to see himself as replacing Nedić and becoming the Führer of a national socialist Serbia with the first twelve members of his detachment, whom he called his "apostles", taking the highest state positions. Furthermore, Janjić proposed to Felix Benzler of the Reich Ministry of Foreign Affairs and August Meyszner of the Schutzstaffel (SS) that he should be entrusted with the creation of two Serbian SS divisions, one for the Eastern Front and one for the front in North Africa. When Nedić heard of Janjić's intentions, he ordered his arrest and the disbanding of the 1st Belgrade Special Combat detachment. Janjić was subsequently detained at the Banjica concentration camp, before being released at the behest of the German Gestapo.

Operations
Between 1942 and 1944, the 1st Belgrade Special Combat detachment was active in the Syrmia region of the Independent State of Croatia. At the end of 1942, it was recorded as having 145 members. Headquartered in a reconfigured primary school where torture and murders occurred, it was envisioned by the Germans as being an elite formation which would operate against the Yugoslav Partisans. However, Janjić was more concerned with usurping Nedić than fighting the Communists. On 22 February 1943, Nedić sent a memorandum to Schäfer, protesting the activities of Janjić's detachment.

Dissolution
After receiving the memorandum, Schäfer divided the 1st Belgrade Special Combat detachment into two parts. Subsequently, Janjić and twenty-six of his men left Belgrade and travelled to Berlin, where they continued to work for the German Gestapo. Another thirty-three members of the detachment remained in Belgrade under the leadership of Janjić's deputy, Svetozar Nećak. Here, they worked to fulfill specific tasks set out to them by the Germans, were not permitted to wear German uniforms, and were ordered to undermine the actions of the Partisans rather than Nedić's administration. Headquartered in his Berlin apartment, Janjić had his men infiltrate the ranks of the Yugoslav forced labourers there, using methods such as blackmail, robbery, and entrapment to expose Partisan sympathizers. Despite these efforts, Janjić's actions were seen as being "[harmful] to German interests," and in May 1944 he was replaced by two other members of his detachment.

Uniform
Occasionally, members of the detachment wore the uniform of Draža Mihailović's Chetniks. At other times, however, they dressed in German military uniforms while pretending not to know the Serbian language.

Footnotes

Notes

References

Books

Journals
 

Serbia under German occupation
Military units and formations of World War II
Military units and formations of Yugoslavia in World War II
Military units and formations established in 1942
Military units and formations disestablished in 1944